The PFL 7 mixed martial arts event for the 2021 season of the Professional Fighters League was held on August 13, 2021. This was the start of the playoffs for the Welterweight and Lightweight divisions. This event aired on ESPN2, with the prelims on ESPN+.

Background
Rory MacDonald and Ray Cooper III headlined the first PFL playoff card, with the Welterweight and Lightweight playoffs holding their semifinal bouts. MacDonald made his third appearance with PFL cage, going 1-1 in the regular season, with his most recent outing being a highly controversial decision loss to Gleison Tibau. He took on the former PFL champion Cooper, who was 2-0 during the regular season in 2021.

The Lightweight bracket saw UFC and boxing veteran Clay Collard take on Raush Manfio while Loik Radzhabov and Alexander Martinez fought in the other lightweight semifinal.

Featured additions included a lightweight contest include two-time PFL champion Natan Schulte taking on 12-time UFC veteran Olivier Aubin-Mercier, as well as planned bout with Swedish PFL vet Sadibou Sy facing 28-time UFC veteran Gleison Tibau.

On August 4, it was announced that João Zeferino was out of his Semi-Final match-up against Magomed Magomedkerimov, with #5 ranked Sadibou Sy taking his place. Curtis Millender (replacing Sy) was then scheduled to face Gleison Tibau. Natan Schulte was also announced to have been scratched, with Olivier Aubin-Mercier now fighting Darrell Horcher. Lastly, Nikolay Aleksakhin was removed from his bout against Brett Cooper, with Cooper now facing Tyler Hill. On August 12, Millender was announced to have pulled out of the bout against Tibau, so Tibau instead faced Micah Terrill, while Magomed Umalatov faced Leandro Silva.

At weigh-ins, Darrell Horcher and Leandro Silva weighed in at 159.25 and 172.5 pounds, missing weight by 3.25 and 1.5 pounds respectively. The bouts proceeded at catchweight and they were fined 20% of their purses, which went to their opponents Olivier Aubin-Mercier and Magomed Umalatov respectively.

Results

2021 PFL Welterweight playoffs

2021 PFL Lightweight playoffs

See also 
List of PFL events
List of current PFL fighters

References

Professional Fighters League
2021 in mixed martial arts
August 2021 sports events in the United States
Events in Hollywood, Florida